Ronald William McLarty (April 26, 1947 – February 8, 2020) was an American actor, playwright, and novelist. He also worked as an audiobook narrator, in which role he recorded over 100 titles and received many Audie Awards.

McLarty appeared in numerous television series, films and stage productions. He also wrote dozens of plays and 10 novels, notably The Memory of Running (2004).

Career 
McLarty began his career in theatre during the early 1970s with one of his earliest professional performances being the role of Lucky in Michael Weller's Moonchildren for the play's American premiere at the Arena Stage in Washington, D.C. in November 1971. McLarty continued with the production when it moved to Broadway in 1972.

McLarty also co-starred on Spenser: For Hire, as Boston homicide detective Sgt. Frank Belson.

Although he enjoyed a successful career as an actor, he had not had much luck finding a publisher for his novel The Memory of Running, until Stephen King happened upon an audiobook version, narrated by McLarty, and praised it as "the best book you can't read". This led to the book's publication by Viking Press, and its rapid rise to bestseller status. McLarty was an accomplished narrator: besides Running, he provided the narrative for a number of audiobooks, including Hunter S. Thompson's Fear and Loathing in Las Vegas and the unabridged audiobook Decision Points by George W. Bush (the abridged version is narrated by the former president himself).

A graduate of Rhode Island College, class of 1969, McLarty was commencement speaker and received a Doctor of Humanities degree from RIC in 2007.

Death 
McLarty died on February 8, 2020, having lived with dementia since 2014.

Novels 
Mislaid. Lulu Publishing Services, 2020, softcover , ebook 
The Dropper. New York: Random House, Books on Tape, 2009 (audiobook), 
The Dropper was scheduled to be released as a Trade Hardcover and Signed Limited Edition by Cemetery Dance Publications in Spring 2012. 
Art in America. New York: Viking Press, 2008, 
Traveler. New York: Viking Press, 2007, 
The Memory of Running.  New York: Viking Press, 2004,

Filmography

Film

Television

Videogames

Audiobooks 
A partial list:

McLarty and Cassidy also narrated books 2 and 3 in the John Puller series, The Forgotten and The Escape.

References

External links 

1947 births
2020 deaths
20th-century American dramatists and playwrights
20th-century American male writers
21st-century American dramatists and playwrights
21st-century American male writers
21st-century American novelists
Actors from Providence, Rhode Island
American male dramatists and playwrights
American male film actors
American male television actors
American male video game actors
American male voice actors
American male novelists
Audiobook narrators
Deaths from dementia in New York (state)
Male actors from Rhode Island
Rhode Island College alumni
Writers from Providence, Rhode Island